Brumoides lineatus, sometimes known as broad vein-longitudinal striped ladybug, is a species of lady beetle found in China, Myanmar, Thailand, Bangladesh, India, Sri Lanka, Nepal, and Pakistan.

Primarily an aphidophagous species, it is known to feed on Aphis glycines, Melanaphis sacchari, Oracella acuta, Phenacoccus solenopsis and Planococcus citri.

References 

Coccinellidae
Insects of Sri Lanka
Beetles described in 1885